A ranch (from ) is an area of land, including various structures, given primarily to ranching, the practice of raising grazing livestock such as cattle and sheep. It is a subtype of a farm. These terms are most often applied to livestock-raising operations in Mexico, the Western United States and Western Canada, though there are ranches in other areas. People who own or operate a ranch are called ranchers, cattlemen, or stockgrowers. Ranching is also a method used to raise less common livestock such as horses, elk, American bison, ostrich, emu, and alpaca.

Ranches generally consist of large areas, but may be of nearly any size. In the western United States, many ranches are a combination of privately owned land supplemented by grazing leases on land under the control of the federal Bureau of Land Management or the United States Forest Service. If the ranch includes arable or irrigated land, the ranch may also engage in a limited amount of farming, raising crops for feeding the animals, such as hay and feed grains.

Ranches that cater exclusively to tourists are called guest ranches or, colloquially, "dude ranches". Most working ranches do not cater to guests, though they may allow private hunters or outfitters onto their property to hunt native wildlife. However, in recent years, a few struggling smaller operations have added some dude ranch features such as horseback rides, cattle drives, and guided hunting to bring in additional income. Ranching is part of the iconography of the "Wild West" as seen in Western movies and rodeos.

Ranch occupations

The person who owns and manages the operation of a ranch is usually called a rancher, but the terms cattleman, stockgrower, or stockman are also sometimes used. If this individual in charge of overall management is an employee of the actual owner, the term foreman or ranch foreman is used. A rancher who primarily raises young stock sometimes is called a cow-calf operator or a cow-calf man. This person is usually the owner, though in some cases, particularly where there is absentee ownership, it is the ranch manager or ranch foreman.

The people who are employees of the rancher and involved in handling livestock are called a number of terms, including cowhand, ranch hand, and cowboy. People exclusively involved with handling horses are sometimes called wranglers.

Origins of ranching
Ranching and the cowboy tradition originated in Spain, out of the necessity to handle large herds of grazing animals on dry land from horseback. During the Reconquista, members of the Spanish nobility and various military orders received large land grants that the Kingdom of Castile had conquered from the Moors. These landowners were to defend the lands put into their control and could use them for earning revenue. In the process it was found that open-range breeding of sheep and cattle (under the Mesta system) was the most suitable use for vast tracts, particularly in the parts of Spain now known as Castilla-La Mancha, Extremadura and Andalusia.

History in North America

When the Conquistadors came to the Americas in the 16th century, followed by settlers, they brought their cattle and cattle-raising techniques with them. Huge land grants by the Spanish (and later Mexican) government, part of the hacienda system, allowed large numbers of animals to roam freely over vast areas. A number of different traditions developed, often related to the original location in Spain from which a settlement originated. For example, many of the traditions of the Jalisco charros in central Mexico come from the Salamanca charros of Castile. The vaquero tradition of Northern Mexico was more organic, developed to adapt to the characteristics of the region from Spanish sources by cultural interaction between the Spanish elites and the native and mestizo peoples.

Cattle ranching flourished in Spanish Florida during the 17th century.

The word "Rancho" in Mexico developed different definitions from what it originally meant in Spain. In the book "Descripción de la Diócesis de Guadalajara de Indias" (1770), Mateo José de Arteaga defined "Ranchos" as "extensions of land where few people live with few assets and sheltering in huts." In 1778, José Alejandro Patiño, in his text "Topografía del Curato de Tlaxomulco," defined Ranchos as "some country houses of little pomp and value, in which poor and middle-class men live, cultivating the small lands that they have or lease in which to sow according to the size of each of their possibilities and raising their domestic rural animals according to their strength."

By the nineteenth century, the words Rancho and Estancia as used in Mexico had been consolidated to define a unit of land that made up a Hacienda or any rural area or the countryside in general. Domingo Revilla in 1844, in his text "Los Rancheros", defined a Rancho or Estancia as "a unit of land which comprises a Hacienda, where cattle and horses are raised, and which is in the care of a Caporal who is the captain of the other cowboys." Niceto de Zamacois, in his book "Historia de Méjico" (1879), defined terms as follows: "...the men of the countryside who carry out their jobs on horseback are given the name of "Rancheros," derived from the word Rancho that is applied to a small hacienda, or to a part of a large one that is divided into racherias or ranchos. Those who carry out the same tasks in the haciedas of Veracruz are given the name of "Jarochos." 

Thus the term Rancho in Mexican Spanish became a unit of land that makes up a hacienda where cattle is raised and where people live in farmhouses. The people that live and work in those Ranchos managing cattle and horses are called Rancheros.

United States

As settlers from the United States moved west, they brought cattle breeds developed on the east coast and in Europe along with them, and adapted their management to the drier lands of the west by borrowing key elements of the Spanish vaquero culture.

However, there were cattle on the eastern seaboard. The ranch makes the somewhat debatable claim of having the oldest cattle operation in what today is the United States, though cattle had been run in the area since European settlers purchased land from the Indian people of the area in 1643. Although there were substantial numbers of cattle on Long Island, as well as the need to herd them to and from common grazing lands on a seasonal basis, the cattle handlers actually lived in houses built on the pasture grounds, and cattle were ear-marked for identification, rather than being branded. The only actual "cattle drives" held on Long Island consisted of one drive in 1776, when the island's cattle were moved in a failed attempt to prevent them from being captured during the Revolutionary War, and three or four drives in the late 1930s, when area cattle were herded down Montauk Highway to pasture ground near Deep Hollow Ranch.

The Open Range

The prairie and desert lands of what today is Mexico and the western United States were well-suited to "open range" grazing. For example, American bison had been a mainstay of the diet for the Native Americans in the Great Plains for centuries. Likewise, cattle and other livestock were simply turned loose in the spring after their young were born and allowed to roam with little supervision and no fences, then rounded up in the fall, with the mature animals driven to market and the breeding stock brought close to the ranch headquarters for greater protection in the winter. The use of livestock branding allowed the cattle owned by different ranchers to be identified and sorted. Beginning with the settlement of Texas in the 1840s, and expansion both north and west from that time, through the Civil War and into the 1880s, ranching dominated western economic activity.

Along with ranchers came the need for agricultural crops to feed both humans and livestock, and hence many farmers also came west along with ranchers. Many operations were "diversified", with both ranching and farming activities taking place. With the Homestead Act of 1862, more settlers came west to set up farms. This created some conflict, as increasing numbers of farmers needed to fence off fields to prevent cattle and sheep from eating their crops. Barbed wire, invented in 1874, gradually made inroads in fencing off privately owned land, especially for homesteads. There was some reduction of land on the Great Plains open to grazing.

End of the Open Range

The end of the open range was not brought about by a reduction in land due to crop farming, but by overgrazing. Cattle stocked on the open range created a tragedy of the commons as each rancher sought increased economic benefit by grazing too many animals on public lands that "nobody" owned. However, being a non-native species, the grazing patterns of ever-increasing numbers of cattle slowly reduced the quality of the rangeland, in spite of the simultaneous massive slaughter of American bison that occurred. The winter of 1886–87 was one of the most severe on record, and livestock that were already stressed by reduced grazing died by the thousands. Many large cattle operations went bankrupt, and others suffered severe financial losses. Thus, after this time, ranchers also began to fence off their land and negotiated individual grazing leases with the American government so that they could keep better control of the pasture land available to their own animals.

Ranching in Hawaii
Ranching in Hawaii developed independently of that in the continental United States. In colonial times, Capt. George Vancouver gave several head of cattle to the Hawaiian king, Pai`ea Kamehameha, monarch of the Hawaiian Kingdom, and by the early 19th century, they had multiplied considerably, to the point that they were wreaking havoc throughout the countryside. About 1812, John Parker, a sailor who had jumped ship and settled in the islands, received permission from Kamehameha to capture the wild cattle and develop a beef industry.

The Hawaiian style of ranching originally included capturing wild cattle by driving them into pits dug in the forest floor. Once tamed somewhat by hunger and thirst, they were hauled out up a steep ramp, and tied by their horns to the horns of a tame, older steer (or ox) and taken to fenced-in areas. The industry grew slowly under the reign of Kamehameha's son Liholiho (Kamehameha II). When Liholiho's brother, Kauikeaouli (Kamehameha III), visited California, then still a part of Mexico, he was impressed with the skill of the Mexican vaqueros. In 1832, he invited several to Hawaii to teach the Hawaiian people how to work cattle.

The Hawaiian cowboy came to be called the paniolo, a Hawaiianized pronunciation of español. Even today, the traditional Hawaiian saddle and many other tools of the ranching trade have a distinctly Mexican look, and many Hawaiian ranching families still carry the surnames of vaqueros who made Hawaii their home.

Ranching in South America
In Argentina and Uruguay, ranches are known as estancias and in Brazil, they are called fazendas. In much of South America, including Ecuador and Colombia, the term hacienda or finca may be used. Ranchero or Rancho are also generic terms used throughout tropical Latin America.

In the colonial period, from the pampas regions of South America all the way to the Minas Gerais state in Brazil, including the semi-arid pampas of Argentina and the south of Brazil, were often well-suited to ranching, and a tradition developed that largely paralleled that of Mexico and the United States. The gaucho culture of Argentina, Brazil and Uruguay are among the cattle ranching traditions born during the period. However, in the 20th century, cattle raising expanded into less-suitable areas of the Pantanal. Particularly in Brazil, the 20th century marked the rapid growth of deforestation, as rain forest lands were cleared by slash and burn methods that allowed grass to grow for livestock, but also led to the depletion of the land within only a few years. Many of indigenous peoples of the rain forest opposed this form of cattle ranching and protested the forest being burnt down to set up grazing operations and farms. This conflict is still a concern in the region today.

Ranches outside the Americas

In Spain, where the origins of ranching can be traced, there are ganaderías operating on dehesa-type land, where fighting bulls are raised. However, ranch-type properties are not seen to any significant degree in the rest of western Europe, where there is far less land area and sufficient rainfall allows the raising of cattle on much smaller farms.

In Australia, a rangeland property is a station (originally in the sense of a place where stock were temporarily stationed). In almost all cases, these are either cattle stations or sheep stations. The largest cattle stations in the world are located in Australia's dry outback rangelands. Owners of these stations are usually known as graziers or pastoralists, especially if they reside on the property. Employees are usually known as stockmen/stockwomen, jackaroos/jillaroos and/or ringers (rather than cowboys). A number of Australian cattle stations are larger than 10,000 km2, with the greatest being Anna Creek Station which measures 23,677 km2 in area (approximately eight times the largest US Ranch). Anna Creek is owned by S Kidman & Co.

The equivalent terms in New Zealand are run and station.

In South Africa, similar large holdings are usually known as a farm (occasionally also ranch) in South African English and plaas in Afrikaans.

See also

Animal husbandry
Cattle station
Garden tools
Estancia
Holistic management
Homestead (buildings)
Intensive animal farming#Cattle
List of Ranches and Stations
Movie ranch
Pastoralism
Ranch school
Ranch-style house
Sheep station

References

Notes

Further reading

External links 

The Canadian Museum of Civilization - Native Ranching and Rodeo Life on the Plains and Plateau 
The Handbook of Texas Online: Ranching
Cattle Ranges of the Southwest, published 1898, hosted by the Portal to Texas History
Guide to ranch archives in Southwest Collection/Special Collections Library at Texas Tech
Cowboys to Cattlemen Virtual Museum Exhibit and Lesson Plans at Grant-Kohrs Ranch NHS from National Park Service

Cowboy culture
Livestock
 
 
 
 
 
 
Types of farms
Western (genre) staples and terminology

he:חווה חקלאית